Yamhill or Yam Hill may refer to:

 Yamhill County, Oregon, a county in Oregon
 Yamhill, Oregon, a city in the western Willamette Valley, located between McMinnville and Forest Grove
 The Yamhill River, a river in northwest Oregon, that flows into the Willamette River
 Yamhill Valley, a valley that contains the Yamhill River
 Yamhill District and Morrison/Southwest 3rd Avenue, a MAX Light Rail station in Portland
Yamhill, a project code name given by Intel Corporation to the Intel 64 CPU architecture